O-Tao  (English: Small oyster omelet with taro) is the local cuisine of Phuket Province, Thailand. It is made of flour and taro, with small oysters, shrimp, bits of pork cracking and spring onions added. It is eaten with a sweet and spicy sauce and is served with a side dishe of bean sprouts.

References

Further reading

Thai cuisine
Omelettes